Alberto Mamba (born 9 October 1994) is a Mozambican athlete competing primarily in the 800 metres. He won two gold medals at the 2014 Lusophony Games.

His personal best in the event is 1:46.32 set in Oslo in 2016. It is the current national record.

Competition record

References

External links 
 

1994 births
Living people
Mozambican male middle-distance runners
Commonwealth Games competitors for Mozambique
Athletes (track and field) at the 2014 Commonwealth Games
Athletes (track and field) at the 2015 African Games
Athletes (track and field) at the 2018 Commonwealth Games
African Games competitors for Mozambique